Caroline Garcia defeated Ana Bogdan in the final, 6–4, 6–1 to win the singles tennis title at the 2022 WTA Poland Open.

Maryna Zanevska was the defending champion (from when the event was last played in Gdynia), but lost in the first round to Kateryna Baindl.

Seeds

Draw

Finals

Top half

Bottom half

Qualifying

Seeds

Qualifiers

Lucky losers

Qualifying draw

First qualifier

Second qualifier

Third qualifier

Fourth qualifier

Fifth qualifier

Sixth qualifier

References 

Main draw
Qualifying draw

2022 WTA Poland Open - 1
2022 WTA Tour